Hasan Erbil (born March 2, 1952) is a retired Turkish lawyer who served as a Chief Public Prosecutor of the Turkish Supreme Court.

Biography
Erbil was born on 2 March 1952 in Denizli, Yüreğil, Serinhisar. He completed Acıpayam High School in 1969. He graduated from Ankara University Faculty of Law in 1973. He graduated from Isparta shortly after his graduation.

Erbil was elected to the Supreme Court of Appeals on 8 May 2001 after serving in various posts and who also served as a member of the Supreme Board of Elections in 2004–2010, was a member of the Supreme Court's Sixth Penal Section, Abdullah Gül was elected to the Chief Public Prosecutor of the Supreme Court of Appeals on 30 April 2011 and commenced his duty on May 21. He retired voluntarily on May 21, 2015. Erbil has written books related to election law.

In July 2006, the Court of Cassation was among the members who defended the idea that Hrant Dink was guilty in the General Assembly.

References

1952 births
Living people
Ankara University alumni
Court of Cassation (Turkey) justices
Turkish civil servants
Turkish prosecutors